Ozéia de Paula Maciel (born January 2, 1982) is a Brazilian football player currently playing for Criciúma.

Career
On 1 March 2010 Grêmio Porto Alegre made official his arrival at Paços de Ferreira, of the Brazilian defender, the footballer is tied to the Portuguese by a contract until 2012, and transfer on loan until December 2010.

Honours
Al-Hilal
Crown Prince Cup: 2013

References

1982 births
Living people
Brazilian footballers
Rio Branco Esporte Clube players
Esporte Clube Santo André players
Coritiba Foot Ball Club players
Sociedade Esportiva do Gama players
Ituano FC players
Avaí FC players
Criciúma Esporte Clube players
F.C. Paços de Ferreira players
Al Hilal SFC players
Primeira Liga players
Brazilian expatriate footballers
Expatriate footballers in Portugal
Expatriate footballers in Romania
Expatriate footballers in Saudi Arabia
Brazilian expatriate sportspeople in Saudi Arabia
Association football defenders